Franca Obianuju Brown  (born 17 May 1967) is a Nigerian actress and film producer who in 2016 was a recipient of the City People Movie Special Recognition Award  at the City People Entertainment Awards.

Early life and education
Brown began her primary school education in St. Mary’s Primary School in Onitsha, Anambra State but migrated to Abia State where she completed her primary school education in St. Maria’s Primary School located in Aba, and obtained her First School Leaving Certificate. Brown for her secondary school education moved to Niger State located in the Northern geographical area of Nigeria to Federal Government Girls College in New Bussa, Niger State where she obtained her West African Senior School Certificate.
Brown in bid to obtain a B.Sc. degree applied to Ahmadu Bello University in Zaria, Kaduna State and was accepted and eventually graduated with a bachelor's degree in law. Brown pursued a second degree and applied to the University of Jos in Plateau State where she was accepted and eventually graduated with a Bachelor’s Degree in Theatre Arts and a master's degree in law.

Career
Brown's acting career received recognition from her role in the TV series titled “Behind The Clouds” Although Brown had made two cameo appearances before her feature on the “Behind The Clouds” TV soap opera series she had failed to establish herself in the Nigerian movie industry and took acting roles mainly on short stage plays. On one of such stage plays titled “Swam Karagbe” which was written by Dr. Iyorchia, three Nigerian talent scouts namely Matt Dadzie, Peter Igho & Ene Oloja were amongst the audience searching for new talents to feature in a TV movie series and after the stage play had been concluded Brown discussed in an interview that she was approached by the three talent scouts and was asked to come for an audition, of which she eventually did and was given the role of Mama Nosa in the TV soap opera series titled “Behind The Clouds”.

Brown is also a movie producer and movie director and has produced & directed a movie titled “Women At Large” of which she was also featured in.

Award
Brown, in 2016, was awarded with the  MovieCity People Special Recognition Award at the City People Entertainment Awards.

Personal life
Brown was a victim of an arson attack perpetuated by her female domestic staff on her property.

Selected filmography
Plane Crash (2008)
Women At Large (2007)
Cross Of Agony (2006)
Deep Bondage (2006)
Desperate Women (2006)
Leap Of Faith (2006)
Serpernt In Paradise (2006)
Clash Of Destiny (2005)
Endless Passion (2005)
My Sister’s Act (2005)
Discord (2004)
Mothers-In-Law (2004)
Sunrise (2002)
Tears & Sorrows (2002)
Valentino (2002)
My Good Will (2001)
The Price (1999)
Obstacles (1998)

References

External links

Living people
Nigerian actresses
Igbo actresses
Ahmadu Bello University alumni
1967 births
Nigerian film award winners
Nigerian film producers
Actresses from Anambra State
University of Jos alumni
20th-century Nigerian actresses
21st-century Nigerian actresses
Nigerian women film producers